The Birthing of Hannibal Valdez is a novella written in 1984 by award-winning Filipino author, poet, journalist, and editor, Alfredo “Freddie” Navarro Salanga.  It is also known as The Birthing of Hannibal Valdez: A Novella  Presented in a bilingual book divided into two parts, the English original version and an accompanying Pilipino version, based on the translation by Romulo A. Sandoval, entitled Ang Pagsisilang kay Hannibal Valdez.  It has a foreword written by Virgilio S. Almario.

One of its lead characters is Leon Valdez.

References

Novellas
1984 novels
Tagalog-language novels
Philippine English-language novels